Nodirbek Yakubboev (born 23 January 2002) is an Uzbek chess player. He was awarded the title of Grandmaster in 2019.

Career
He has won the Uzbekistani Chess Championship three times; in 2016, 2018 and 2020. He came second in the Zone 3.4 Zonal Open Championship in 2021, qualifying for the Chess World Cup 2021.

Family
He has an older sister, Nilufar Yakubbaeva, who has won the Women's section of the Uzbekistani Chess Championship multiple times.

References

External links
 
 
 
 

2002 births
Living people
Uzbekistani chess players
Chess grandmasters
21st-century Uzbekistani people